Valentim Amões (4th July 1960 - 19th January 2008) was an Angolan politician and businessman.

Born in the village of Camela  (now known as Camela Amões Village) in the Huambo Province, he was a member of the Central Committee of the People's Movement for the Liberation of Angola (MPLA), having defected from UNITA.

He was killed along with 12 other people on 19 January 2008, when a B-200 aircraft headed for Huambo City struck the Serra Mbave mountains in the Huambo Province. Angolan President José Eduardo dos Santos said that he "was a dynamic, courageous and perspicacious businessman". He was 47 on the day of the tragedy.

References

1959 births
2008 deaths
Victims of aviation accidents or incidents in Angola
People from Huambo Province
MPLA politicians